Robert Battersby is a Canadian coxswain. He competed in the men's coxed pair event at the 1972 Summer Olympics.

References

Year of birth missing (living people)
Living people
Canadian male rowers
Olympic rowers of Canada
Rowers at the 1972 Summer Olympics
Place of birth missing (living people)
Coxswains (rowing)
Pan American Games medalists in rowing
Pan American Games silver medalists for Canada
Rowers at the 1975 Pan American Games